Hypocrita chalybea is a moth of the family Erebidae. It was described by Erich Martin Hering in 1925. It is found in Bolivia and Ecuador.

References

Hypocrita
Moths described in 1925